Wilhelmus Wilhelmius (1720–1771) was a Dutch minister, mathematician and philosopher.

Life
He was baptised on 19 March 1720 in Rotterdam, son of Johannes Wilhelmius, a minister, and grandson of the philosopher Wilhelmus Wilhelmius the Elder. He matriculated at the University of Leiden in 1735, and graduated at the University of Utrecht in 1739. His dissertation, under Joseph Serrurier, was on the mind-body problem.

In 1742 he travelled to England and became a Fellow of the Royal Society, with an introduction from Petrus van Musschenbroek. On his return in 1743 he became a minister in Lekkerkerk. After some other positions he settled in Middelburg in 1749.

He married Aletta Maria van den Brande in 1751, and she brought him a large fortune. They bought an estate at Brakel.

References
 NNBW entry

Notes

External links
CERL page

1720 births
1771 deaths
18th-century Dutch philosophers
18th-century Dutch Calvinist and Reformed ministers
Fellows of the Royal Society
Clergy from Rotterdam
Utrecht University alumni